Roberto Koifman (born 21 August 1956) is a Chilean alpine skier. He competed in two events at the 1976 Winter Olympics.

References

1956 births
Living people
Chilean male alpine skiers
Olympic alpine skiers of Chile
Alpine skiers at the 1976 Winter Olympics
Place of birth missing (living people)